The Nordic Quizzing Championships is a bi-annual quiz event in the Nordic and Baltic countries. Top quizzers from Denmark, Sweden, Norway, Finland, Iceland, Faroe Islands, Greenland, Åland, Estonia, Latvia, and Lithuania are invited.

The event includes three different competitions: An Individual Competition, a Team Competition, and a Pairs Competition.

International Quizzing Association delegates from Estonia, Finland and Norway, meeting at the European Quizzing Championships in Blackpool in November 2007, began talks with a view to instituting a Nordic Championships. The first event was hosted by Tallinn, Estonia in 2008. In 2010 the competition was in Turku, Finland. The 2012 championships took place in Copenhagen, Denmark. In 2015 the competition was held in Oslo, Norway following a 3-year break. In 2018 the championships took place in Tallinn, Estonia.

Results

2008: Tallinn 
10 May 2008.

2010: Turku 
22 and 23 May 2010.

2012: Copenhagen 
19 and 20 May 2012.

2015: Oslo 
25 and 26 April 2015.

2018: Tallinn 

19 and 20 May 2018.

References

External links 
Official website of the Nordic Quizzing Championships 2012

Quiz games
Inter-Nordic sports competitions